Murder in Mind is a 1997 direct-to-video crime film directed by Andrew Morahan.

Plot summary
A woman is hypnotized in an effort to reveal the identity of a murderer who could be the woman herself.

Characters
Nigel Hawthorne as Dr. Ellis 
Mary-Louise Parker as Caroline Walker 
Jimmy Smits as Peter Walker 
Jason Scott Lee as Holloway 
Gailard Sartain as Charlie 
Mitch Ward as Court Clerk 
Jon Cedar as superior officer
Ingo Neuhaus as Officer 
Art Metrano as Judge 
Rob LaBelle as Lecturer
Eric Cadora as Secretary #2, Patrick

References

External links 
 
 

1997 films
1997 crime films
American crime films
Films set in California
Films directed by Andy Morahan
1990s English-language films
1990s American films